Lepisiota is an Old World genus of ants in the subfamily Formicinae. They nest in rotten wood, in standing trees or in the ground, generally in less forested areas.

Species

Lepisiota acuta Xu, 1994
Lepisiota affinis (Santschi, 1937)
Lepisiota ajjer (Bernard, 1953)
Lepisiota albata (Santschi, 1935)
Lepisiota alexis (Santschi, 1937)
Lepisiota ambigua (Santschi, 1935)
Lepisiota angolensis (Santschi, 1937)
Lepisiota annandalei (Mukerjee, 1930)
Lepisiota arabica (Collingwood, 1985)
Lepisiota arenaria (Arnold, 1920)
Lepisiota arnoldi (Forel, 1913)
Lepisiota aurea (Karavaiev, 1933)
Lepisiota bipartita (Smith, 1861)
Lepisiota cacozela (Stitz, 1916)
Lepisiota canescens (Emery, 1897)
Lepisiota capensis (Mayr, 1862)
Lepisiota capitata (Forel, 1913)
Lepisiota carbonaria (Emery, 1892)
Lepisiota chapmani (Wheeler, 1935)
Lepisiota crinita (Mayr, 1895)
Lepisiota curta (Emery, 1897)
Lepisiota dammama Collingwood & Agosti, 1996
Lepisiota dendrophila (Arnold, 1949)
Lepisiota depilis (Emery, 1897)
Lepisiota deplanata (Stitz, 1911)
Lepisiota depressa (Santschi, 1914)
Lepisiota dhofara Collingwood & Agosti, 1996
Lepisiota dolabellae (Forel, 1911)
Lepisiota egregia (Forel, 1913)
Lepisiota elegantissima Collingwood & Van Harten, 2011
Lepisiota emmelii (Kutter, 1932)
Lepisiota erythraea (Forel, 1910)
Lepisiota fergusoni (Forel, 1895)
Lepisiota foreli (Arnold, 1920)
Lepisiota frauenfeldi (Mayr, 1855) ("browsing ant" - a pest in Australia) 
Lepisiota gerardi (Santschi, 1915)
Lepisiota gracilicornis (Forel, 1892)
Lepisiota harteni Collingwood & Agosti, 1996
Lepisiota hexiangu Terayama, 2009
Lepisiota hirsuta (Santschi, 1914)
Lepisiota imperfecta (Santschi, 1926)
Lepisiota incisa (Forel, 1913)
Lepisiota kabulica (Pisarski, 1967)
Lepisiota karawaiewi (Kuznetsov-Ugamsky, 1929)
Lepisiota longinoda (Arnold, 1920)
Lepisiota megacephala (Weber, 1943)
Lepisiota melanogaster (Emery, 1915)
Lepisiota melas (Emery, 1915)
Lepisiota mlanjiensis (Arnold, 1946)
Lepisiota modesta (Forel, 1894)
Lepisiota monardi (Santschi, 1930)
Lepisiota nigrescens (Karavaiev, 1912)
Lepisiota nigrisetosa (Santschi, 1935)
Lepisiota nigriventris (Emery, 1899)
Lepisiota obtusa (Emery, 1901)
Lepisiota oculata (Santschi, 1935)
Lepisiota opaca (Forel, 1892)
Lepisiota opaciventris (Finzi, 1936)
Lepisiota palpalis (Santschi, 1935)
Lepisiota piliscapa (Santschi, 1935)
Lepisiota quadraticeps (Arnold, 1944)
Lepisiota reticulata Xu, 1994
Lepisiota riyadha Collingwood & Agosti, 1996
Lepisiota rothneyi (Forel, 1894)
Lepisiota rubrovaria (Forel, 1910)
Lepisiota rugithorax (Santschi, 1930)
Lepisiota schoutedeni (Santschi, 1935)
Lepisiota semenovi (Ruzsky, 1905)
Lepisiota sericea (Forel, 1892)
Lepisiota silvicola (Arnold, 1920)
Lepisiota somalica (Menozzi, 1927)
Lepisiota spinisquama (Kuznetsov-Ugamsky, 1929)
Lepisiota spinosior (Forel, 1913)
Lepisiota splendens (Karavaiev, 1912)
Lepisiota submetallica (Arnold, 1920)
Lepisiota syriaca (André, 1881)
Lepisiota tenuipilis (Santschi, 1935)
Lepisiota validiuscula (Emery, 1897)
Lepisiota xichangensis (Wu & Wang, 1995)

References

External links

Formicinae
Ant genera
Taxa named by Felix Santschi